James Russell Miller (20 March 1840 – 2 July 1912) was a popular Christian author,  Editorial Superintendent of the Presbyterian Board of Publication, and pastor of several churches in Pennsylvania and Illinois.

Early years
James Russell Miller was born near Frankfort Springs, Pennsylvania, on the banks of the Big Traverse, which according to his biographer,  John T. Faris, is a merry little mill stream which drains one of the most beautiful valleys in the southern part of Beaver County. His parents were James Alexander Miller and Eleanor Creswell who were of Irish/Scottish stock.

Miller was the second child of ten, but his older sister died before he was born. James and his sisters attended the district school in Hanover Township, Beaver County, Pennsylvania until, when James was about fourteen, his father moved to a farm near Calcutta, Ohio. The children then went to the district school during the short winters and worked on the farm during summer.

In 1857, James entered Beaver Academy and in 1862 he progressed to Westminster College, Pennsylvania, from which he was graduated in June 1862. Then in the autumn of that year he entered the theological seminary of the United Presbyterian Church at Allegheny, Pennsylvania.

The Christian Commission
The Christian Commission was created in response to the disastrous First Battle of Bull Run. On 14 November 1861, the National Committee of the Young Men's Christian Association (YMCA) called a convention which met in New York City. The work of the United States Christian Commission was outlined and the organization completed the next day.

In March 1863, Miller promised to serve for six weeks as a delegate of the United States Christian Commission, but at the end of this time he was persuaded to become an Assistant Field Agent and later he was promoted to General Field Agent. He left the Commission on 15 July 1865.

The Pastorate
Miller resumed his interrupted studies at the Allegheny Theological Seminary in the fall of 1865 and completed them in the spring of 1867. That summer he accepted a call from the First United Presbyterian Church of New Wilmington, Pennsylvania. He was ordained and installed on 11 September 1867.

Rev. Miller held firmly to the great body of truth professed by the United Presbyterian Church, in which he had been reared, but he did not like the rule requiring the exclusive singing of the Psalms, and he felt that it was not honest for him to profess this as one of the articles of his Christian belief. He therefore resigned from his pastorate to seek membership in the Presbyterian Church (USA). In his two years as pastor, nearly two hundred names were added to the church roll.

The Old and New School Presbyterian Churches were reunited as the Presbyterian Church (USA) on 12 November 1869, and Miller became pastor of the Bethany Presbyterian Church of Philadelphia just nine days later. When he became pastor at Bethany the membership was seventy five and when he resigned in 1878 Bethany was the largest Presbyterian church in Philadelphia, having about twelve hundred members.

Rev. Miller then accepted the pastorate of the New Broadway Presbyterian Church of Rock Island, Illinois.

In 1880 Westminster College, his alma mater conferred on him the degree of Doctor of Divinity and later in the same year came the invitation to undertake editorial work for the Presbyterian Board of Publication in Philadelphia. Hence Dr. Miller had to resign the Rock Island, Illinois pastorate.

In Philadelphia, Miller became interested in the Hollond Mission and eventually became its pastor. During the sixteen months of the pastorate the church membership grew from 259 to 1,164 and Sunday School membership climbed from 1,024 to 1,475.

On 29 October 1899, St. Paul Church in West Philadelphia was organized with sixty-six members. Miller was chosen temporary supply and became pastor in 1906. Miller remained pastor until the year of his death, 1912. The church at that time had 1,397 members.

Family
On 22 June 1870, Miller married Miss Louise E. King of Argyle, New York, whom he had met two years earlier. They had  three children, 
 William King, 
 Russel King, a fairly well known music teacher and composer, and  
 Mary  Wannamker Miller who married W.B. Mount.

Editor and author
Miller began contributing articles to religious papers while at Allegheny Seminary. This continued while he was at the First United, Bethany, and New Broadway churches. In 1875, Miller took over from Henry C. McCook, D.D. when the latter discontinued his weekly articles in The Presbyterian, which was published in Philadelphia.

Five years later, in 1880, Miller became assistant to the Editorial Secretary at the Presbyterian Board of Publication, also in Philadelphia.

When Dr. Miller joined the Board its only periodicals were 
The Westminster Teacher 
The Westminster Lesson Leaf
The Senior Quarterly
The Sabbath School Visitor
The Sunbeam
The Presbyterian Monthly Record

During his tenure at the board the following periodicals were added: 
The Junior Lesson Leaf in 1881 
The German Lesson Leaf in 1881 
Forward in 1882 
The Morning Star in 1883 
The Junior Quarterly in 1885
The Lesson Card circa in 1894 
The Intermediate Quarterly circa 1895 
The Question Leaf circa 1996 
The Blackboard circa 1898
The Home Department Quarterly in 1899 
The Primary Quarterly in 1901 
The Normal Quarterly in 1902 
The Bible Roll in 1902 
The Beginners Lessons (forerunner of The Graded Lessons) in 1903 
The Primary Teacher in 1906 
The Graded Lessons from 1909 to 1912
for Beginners
Primary
Junior 
Intermediate 
Senior
The Westminster Adult Bible Class in 1909

The Sabbath School Visitor — the Board's oldest periodical — became The Comrade in 1909.

From 1880, when James Miller first joined the Board to 1911, when he effectively retired because of ill health, the total annual circulation grew from 9,256,386 copies to 66,248,215 copies.

Dr. Miller's first book, Week Day Religion, was published by the board in 1880, the year he joined the Board.

Books
Miller's lasting fame is through his books. Many are still in publication.

John T. Faris provides the following Bibliography.

 Week Day Religion, 1880
 Home Making, 1882 (currently published by The Vision Forum as The Family)
 In His Steps: For Those Beginning the Christian Life, 1885
 The Wedded Life, 1886
 Silent Times, 1886
 Come Ye Apart, 1887
 The Marriage Altar, 1888
 Practical Religion, 1888
 Bits of Pasture, 1890
 Making the Most of Life, 1891
 The Everyday of Life, 1892
 Girls: Faults and Ideals, 1892
 Young Men: Faults and Ideals, 1893
 Glimpses Through Life's Windows, 1893
 The Building of Character, 1894
 Secrets of Happy Home Life, 1894
 Life’s Byways and Waysides, 1895
 For a Busy Day, 1895
 Year Book, 1895
 Family Prayers, 1895
 The Hidden Life, 1895
 The Blessing of Cheerfulness, 1896
 Things to Live For, 1896
 Story of A Busy Life, 1896
 A Gentle Heart, 1896
 Personal Friendships of Jesus, 1897
 By the Still Waters, 1897
 The Secret of Gladness, 1898
 The Joy of Service, 1898
 The Master’s Blessed, 1898
 Young People’s Problems, 1898
 Unto the Hill, 1899
 Strength and Beauty, 1899
 The Golden Gate of Prayer, 1900
 Loving My Neighbour, 1900
 The Ministry of Comfort, 1901
 Summer Gathering, 1901
 How? When? Where?, 1901
 The Upper Currents, 1902
 Today and Tomorrow, 1902
 In Perfect Peace, 1902
 The Lesson of Love, 1903
 The Face of the Master, 1903
 Our New Eden, 1904
 Finding the Way, 1904
 The Inner Life, 1904
 Manual for Communicant Classes, 1905
 The Beauty of Kindness, 1905
 When the Song Begins, 1905
 The Best Things, 1907
 Glimpses of the Heavenly Life, 1907
 Morning Thoughts for Every Day in The Year, 1907
 Evening Thoughts, 1908
 The Gate Beautiful, 1909
 The Master's Friendships, 1909
 The Beauty of Every Day, 1910
 The Beauty of Self Control, 1911
 Learning to Love, 1911
 The Book of Comfort, 1912
 The Joy of The Lord, 1912
 Devotional Hours with the Bible (eight volumes), 1909-1913

This list is incomplete; it captures only a few of Miller pamphlets, of which there are several dozen. Some publications have alternative titles (e.g. one of Miller's best selling works, Bits of Pasture was renamed In Green Pastures).

Other books known to exist are:

 The Garden of the Heart (Hodder and Stoughton, 1910, copyright 1906)
 The Pathos of Divine Love, 1906

According to biographer John Thomson Faris, Miller sold over two million copies of his books during his lifetime.

Archival collections 
The Presbyterian Historical Society in Philadelphia, Pennsylvania, has J.R. Miller's papers including materials from the United States Christian Commission, sermons, and a scrapbook of his articles.

References

External links
Archive Miller has over thirty of JR Miller's full length books on line as well as ten of his shorter works. The numbers increase monthly
Morning Thoughts, a daily devotional by J. R. Miller
 
 

1840 births
1912 deaths
Presbyterian Church (USA) teaching elders
Print editors
Westminster College (Pennsylvania) alumni
United Presbyterian Church in the United States of America ministers
People from Beaver County, Pennsylvania
Writers from Pennsylvania